Love Letters with Intent is a 1985 Yugoslav film directed by Zvonimir Berković.

External links

Love Letters with Intent at Filmski-Programi.hr 

1985 films
Films directed by Zvonimir Berković
Croatian drama films
1985 drama films
Yugoslav drama films